The Cerritos Library is the civic library for the City of Cerritos, California. It was rededicated on March 16, 2002, with the new moniker and the current futuristic design. It was the first building to feature an exterior clad with titanium panels in the United States. It is the first "Experience Library" and focuses on themed spaces, high quality artwork, and inspirational architecture.

History
During Cerritos' period of rapid growth in the 1970s a series of high-profile developments including a new library was planned. Debate whether or not to join the County of Los Angeles Public Library system and share a branch with neighboring Artesia or to create a separate facility persisted early on. In the end, with the help of various associations such as the Friends of the Cerritos Library and the then-city manager (who wanted to save the residents from a $20-a-year library tax), the city decided to build its own municipal library.

On the corner of Bloomfield and 183rd Street on the site of a former strawberry field the initial groundbreaking for the Cerritos Library took place in June 1972. The building would be the first building added to the Cerritos Civic Center and was dedicated on October 13, 1973 in honor of Cerritos native, First Lady Patricia Nixon and all other First Ladies both past and present. The site was designed by local contractor AJ Padelford & Son using blueprints from architect Maurice Fleishman, AIA.

In addition, the library also had a children's area, theater and law library. Three years later, Cerritos joined the Metropolitan Cooperative Library System giving patrons access to more than 3 million items at 26 member libraries and interlibrary loans. From the beginning, the seven-day-a-week schedule was popular. 

By 1986, the Cerritos economy was thriving and the city earmarked $6.6 million to remodel the 13-year-old building that would add another 21,000 square feet (2,000 m²) to the area. A community room for meetings and receptions was added as well as a new wing that housed reference, study space, and lounge seating. New furnishings, etched glass, and marble counters were also added. The 1986 Cerritos Library won a national award of excellence, the highest honor, by the American Institute of Architecture and the American Library Association.

By this time, 65% of Cerritos residents used the library and borrowed half a million books and media every year. The 1986 expansion resulted in a 40% growth in the number of patrons and a 33% boost in the number of materials circulated.

In the spring of 2000, the western half the Cerritos Library was torn down to make way for the new Cerritos Millennium Library. Prior to the new construction, books and computer stations were inundated with people waiting in line to use some of the materials. Books were constantly being shelved and programs were very popular. Many cities around the world made plans to commemorate the new millennium, and in Cerritos, it was decided that the library would be a "library of the future."

Jim Nardini, AIA, of Charles Walton Associates acted as the project architect on the library. Judy Van Wyk and the team at The Design Studio, INC, provided concept and interior design. The library was built by CW Driver Contractors of Los Angeles; the $40 million library was completed in 2002.

Design, themes, and elements

The Cerritos Library is the result of a reevaluation of library services and the emergence of the Internet as a resource. The book, The Experience Economy (B. Joseph Pine et al., Harvard Business School Press, 1999), served as an inspiration for city planning, designers, and staff to make the library more user friendly and customer-service–oriented. The city studied the work of futurists in order to learn information on cutting-edge library services, including interactive learning. The Guggenheim Museum Bilbao served as additional inspiration for the layout and modern design of the exterior of the building.

Children's library
The children's library includes the saltwater aquarium, which was expanded to a 15,000 gallon tank complete with coral and sharks, a lighthouse in which children can read, a model space shuttle ("The Spirit of Cerritos"), a Tyrannosaurus rex fossil replica (named Stan), a little theater, an arts and crafts room, simulated atmospheric changes in a rainforest theme, a night sky theme, a help desk, and about three dozen computer workstations.

Old World Reading Room
Themed after 19th century European elements, the Old World Reading Room contains leather-bound books, first editions, a fireplace, study spaces, and chandeliers.

Main Street
The Main Street houses a local history room, a souvenir store, and the circulation desk. It is themed to imitate a pedestrian street for patrons to pass through and connect to the other destinations on the first floor.

Great Room
The Great Room is themed after the Craftsman carpentry style. Paperbacks, periodicals and newspapers are located here. Internet Express Stations are available in this area as well.

World Traditions
In keeping with a reputation for being one of the most diverse cities in the state, the Cerritos Millennium Library maintains an Art Deco-style "World Traditions" area on the second floor. It houses a large collection of print and multimedia resources in several languages.

Multimedia
Below the "World Traditions" is the Multimedia room where DVDs and other videos, audio and materials geared towards young adults are located. It is also themed in an Art Deco style consistent with the "World Traditions" level above.

21st Century
On the other half of the second floor is the 21st Century floor. It is a futuristic level and design elements reflect a modern style. Most of the computer workstations are located here, as well as several study rooms that patrons can reserve. The library reference desk is on this floor and illuminated bookshelves are next to the reference desk.

Conference rooms
The third floor of the library houses a Board Room as well as the Skyline Room banquet/reception hall. The Hi-Tech Lab/auditorium is also located on this floor.

"Illuminations"

In November 2006, in recognition of the City's 50th anniversary, the city unveiled a book shaped sculpture near the front entrance to the library. The sculpture, designed and built by artist Terry Braunstein, is called Illumination and contains heritage photos of the city and mosaics depicting life in the city. The sculpture is 10 feet tall. The base of the sculpture contains lights, which are turned on at night to enhance the sculpture's artistic design.

Use of technology
Technology supports all aspects of the Cerritos Millennium Library. The library has its own Intranet (MyClio). Multimedia resource centers combine print materials with Web resources, in-house content and computer graphics. Computerized InfoStations are scattered throughout the library. Public areas have computers and ethernet ports for library card holders to use and librarians come equipped with wireless headsets and handheld computers to assist patrons. A computerized circulation system that uses radio frequency keeps track of materials in circulation.

Awards and recognition
 Best Public Library in 2003 "Best of L.A." issue by Los Angeles Magazine
 Best Public Library in 2003 by L.A. Parent Magazine
 Best Public Library in 2004 by Reader's Digest magazine
 Affiliate with the Smithsonian Institution to enhance exhibits
 American Library Association/American Institute of Architects "Award of Excellence"
 Expy Award in 2003 by thinkabout 
 Thea Award in 2003 by the Themed Entertainment Association
 Special Mention Library of the Year in 2004 by Library Journal
 Best Library for Children in 2008 "Best of L.A" issue by Los Angeles Magazine
 Five star rating in March 2009 Library Journal America's Star Libraries#28 in the 50 Most Beautiful Libraries in the World by Best Value Schools 2014References

Further reading

Eftychiou, A., & Cenovich, M. (2006). Cerritos at 50: celebrating our past and our future. Virginia Beach, VA: The Donning Company Publishers.Cerritos Library History. (n.d.). Retrieved October 3, 2006 from http://www.ci.cerritos.ca.us/library/libhistory.htmlCerritos launches the "Experience Library".'' (n.d.). Retrieved October 3, 2006 from http://www.ci.cerritos.ca.us/library/experience_library.html

External links

Library buildings completed in 2002
Buildings and structures celebrating the third millennium
Cerritos, California
Culture of Los Angeles
Landscape design history of the United States
Libraries in Los Angeles County, California
Libraries established in 1973
Public libraries in California
Smithsonian Institution affiliates
Tourist attractions in Los Angeles County, California
1973 establishments in California